The Priest of Cadiz is a gold  and bronze figure, 12.9 cm high, that dates from the 8th century BC. It is on display in the National Archaeological Museum of Spain in Madrid.

The figure was found in 1928, during the foundation work of the Telefónica building in Cadiz. The workers delivered it to the architect Francisco Hernández Rubio. Later it was integrated into Madrid's National Archaeological Museum collection.

It has been proposed that he represents the Egyptian god Ptah. According  to recent studies the figure is considered to represent a priest of the temple of Melqart. The figure is identified as a divinity because of posture and clothes, the attributes he holds in his hands and the gold band across his face.

The figure was imported possibly from Phoenicia because of its bronze, incorporating arsenic and zinc composition.

Bibliography 
 Javier Jiménez Ávila: La toréutica orientalizante en la Península Ibérica , Madrid, 2002, 
 Asunción Martín: Sacerdote de Cádiz, M.A.N., 2008, NIPO 551-09-006-X

References

Archaeological discoveries in Spain
8th-century BC works